Lucapina suffusa is a species of sea snail, a marine gastropod mollusk in the family Fissurellidae, the keyhole limpets.

Description

Distribution

References

Fissurellidae
Gastropods described in 1850